Charles Dilloway (christened 5 March 1781) was an English cricketer who played for Sussex. He was born in Petworth.

Dilloway made a single first-class appearance for the team, in 1825, against Hampshire. Batting in the lower order in the same team as his brother, John, he scored 15 not out in the first innings of the match and a duck in the second innings.

External links
Charles Dilloway at Cricket Archive 

1781 births
English cricketers
Sussex cricketers
People from Petworth
Year of death missing
English cricketers of 1787 to 1825